Code XIII is a regional rugby league programme on Channel M, and was originally presented by Barney, the presenter of Channel M's boxing programme Seconds Out. Jack Dearden took up the role of presenter following a move to the studio in 2007.

The programme began in the 2006 season and focused mainly on teams playing in the Greater Manchester area such as Salford City Reds, Wigan Warriors, Leigh Centurions, Rochdale Hornets, Oldham Roughyeds and Swinton Lions. A spin-off series entitled Code XIII: Grassroots focused on local amateur rugby league highlights. Although the programme predominantly concentrated on the main Greater Manchester teams, it also touched upon the progress of other teams in the region including Warrington and Widnes.

The management at Channel M decided that due to the Superleague rights held by Sky Sports, they were not willing to go forward with another series that did not contain game action, and that the asking price for buying in the footage was more than the Guardian Media Group could afford. It was for this reason that the programme was not recommissioned by Channel M for the 2009 season.

External links 

Code XIII on Channel M
Code XIII rugby league blog

2006 British television series debuts
2009 British television series endings
2000s British sports television series
Rugby league in the United Kingdom
Rugby league television shows
English-language television shows